Nino Everaers (born 8 August 1999) is a Dutch footballer who plays as a midfielder for Vierde Divisie club Meerssen.

Career
He made his Eerste Divisie debut for MVV Maastricht on 9 November 2018 in a game against FC Volendam, as a 66th-minute substitute for Doğan Gölpek.

On 3 May 2020, Everaers joined Meerssen.

References

External links
 

1999 births
Living people
Dutch footballers
Footballers from Maastricht
Association football midfielders
MVV Maastricht players
SV Meerssen players
Eerste Divisie players
Vierde Divisie players